In Greek mythology, Cycnus (Ancient Greek: Κύκνος "swan") or Cygnus, was a king of Liguria, a beloved and kin of Phaethon, who lamented his death and was subsequently turned into a swan and then a constellation.

Mythology

Family 
Cycnus was the son of Sthenelus and the lover of Phaethon (Servius explicitly writes "amator", or lover). According to Ovid, he was a distant relative of Phaethon on his mother's side. Servius also mentions that Cycnus had a son named Cupavo.

Transformation 
After Phaethon died, Cycnus sat by the river Eridanos mourning his death. The gods turned him into a swan to relieve him of his sorrow. Even then he retained memories of Phaethon's death, and would avoid the sun's heat because of that. Swans are known for mourning their mate for many days when they die, which suggests that Cygnus and Phaethon were lovers.  According to Virgil, Cycnus lamented Phaethon's death till he grew old, so his gray hair became gray feathers upon his transformation. Pausanias mentions Cycnus, king of the Ligyes (Ligurians), as a renowned musician who after his death was changed into a swan by Apollo. Servius also writes of Cycnus as a musician and a friend of Phaethon, and states that he was changed into a swan and later was placed among the stars by Apollo (that is, as the constellation Cygnus), who had also once blessed him with talent in singing. Cycnus's talent as a musician may serve the association with the concept of the swan song suggested in Hyginus's account.

Notes

References

Ancient 
 Pausanias, Pausanias Description of Greece with an English Translation by W.H.S. Jones, Litt.D., and H.A. Ormerod, M.A., in 4 Volumes. Cambridge, MA, Harvard University Press; London, William Heinemann Ltd. 1918. Online version at the Perseus Digital Library.
 Vergil, Aeneid. Theodore C. Williams. trans. Boston. Houghton Mifflin Co. 1910. Online version at the Perseus Digital Library.
 Ovid, Metamorphoses, Volume I: Books 1-8. Translated by Frank Justus Miller. Revised by G. P. Goold. Loeb Classical Library No. 42. Cambridge, Massachusetts: Harvard University Press, 1977, first published 1916. . Online version at Harvard University Press.
 Hyginus, Gaius Julius, The Myths of Hyginus. Edited and translated by Mary A. Grant, Lawrence: University of Kansas Press, 1960.
 Maurus Servius Honoratus, In Vergilii carmina comentarii. Servii Grammatici qui feruntur in Vergilii carmina commentarii; recensuerunt Georgius Thilo et Hermannus Hagen. Georgius Thilo. Leipzig. B. G. Teubner. 1881. Online version at the Perseus Digital Library.

Modern 
 Smith, William, Dictionary of Greek and Roman Biography and Mythology, London (1873). Online version at the Perseus Digital Library.

External links 
 CYCNUS from The Theoi Project

Kings in Greek mythology
LGBT themes in Greek mythology
Fictional LGBT characters in literature
Metamorphoses characters
Metamorphoses into birds in Greek mythology